Ludwig & Mayer was a German type foundry in Frankfurt am Main, Germany. Many important designers worked for the Ludwig and Mayer type foundry, including Heinrich Jost, Karlgeorg Hoefer, Helmut Matheis, and most notably Jakob Erbar, whose Erbar Book was one of the first geometric sans-serif typefaces, predating both Paul Renner's Futura and Rudolf Koch's Kabel by some five years.  Starting in 1925, Ludwig & Mayer types were distributed in the United States by Continental Type Founders Association. When the foundry ceased operations in 1984, rights to the typefaces was transmitted to the Neufville Typefoundry.

Typefaces
These foundry types were produced by Ludwig & Mayer:

House Faces

Designer Faces

Licensed Faces
The following faces were originally faces cut for line-casting by Simoncini SA.

References

External links
Ludwig + Mayer at MyFonts

Letterpress font foundries of Germany
Manufacturing companies based in Frankfurt
Design companies established in 1875
Design companies disestablished in 1984
1875 establishments in Germany
1984 disestablishments in Germany
Manufacturing companies established in 1875
Manufacturing companies disestablished in 1984